The World University Service (WUS) is an international organisation founded in 1920 in Vienna as an offshoot of the World Student Christian Federation to meet the needs of students and academics in the aftermath of World War I. After World War II, it merged with European Student Relief to become International Student Service and eventually as WUS in the 1950s. In the 1970s it began to focus on campaigning for educational rights for the disadvantaged.

References

Further reading
Thompson, Mary, A. (1982) Unofficial Ambassadors: The Story of International Student Service. International Student Service.

See also
 David Atherton-Smith

External links 
 WUS country list
 Catalogue of the WUS archives, held at the Modern Records Centre, University of Warwick

Student organizations established in 1920
International student organizations